Frederick Charles Broker (January 17, 1893 - December 13, 1971) was a professional football player who played in the National Football League during the 1922 season. That season, he joined the NFL's Oorang Indians. The Indians were a team based in LaRue, Ohio, composed only of Native Americans, and coached by Jim Thorpe.

References

Uniform Numbers of the NFL

1893 births
1971 deaths
American football tackles
Carlisle Indians football players
Oorang Indians players
People from Becker County, Minnesota
Players of American football from Minnesota